Paul Wille was a Belgian senator and still is a member of the Open Flemish Liberals and Democrats. He was elected as a member of the Belgian Senate in 2007.

Notes

Living people
Year of birth missing (living people)
Open Vlaamse Liberalen en Democraten politicians
Members of the Belgian Federal Parliament